FSMA may refer to:
 Ferromagnetic shape-memory alloy, a type of shape memory material which responds to magnetic fields
 Financial Services and Markets Act 2000, a UK law that created the Financial Services Authority
 Financial Services and Markets Authority, a Belgian government agency
 Food Safety Modernization Act, a U.S. law that expands the authority of the Food and Drug Administration
 Marie Louise Island Airport's ICAO code
 Optical fiber connector of type F-SMA (fiber sub-miniature assembly)